Long Lane is an unincorporated community in Dallas County, Missouri, United States. It is located on Route 32, eleven miles east of Buffalo.

Long Lane is part of the Springfield, Missouri Metropolitan Statistical Area.

History
Long Lane was founded in 1845. The community was named for the relatively long road leading to the original town site. A post office called Long Lane has been in operation since 1850.

Features
The town contains the Long Lane Volunteer Fire Department.

School
Long Lane students attend school in Buffalo Missouri due to school consolidation closing the elementary school in town.

References

Unincorporated communities in Dallas County, Missouri
Springfield metropolitan area, Missouri
Unincorporated communities in Missouri